Edgar Arro (24 March 1911 Tallinn – 24 December 1978 Tallinn) was an Estonian composer.

In 1935 he graduated from Tallinn Conservatory in organ discipline and in composition discipline.

During WW II he was mobilised to the rear area in the Soviet Union. During the war times he took place in the work of the State Artistic Ensembles of the Estonian SSR.

Since 1944 he was a member of Estonian Composers' Union.

From 1944 to 1952 he taught at Tallinn Music School. From 1944 to 1978 he taught music theory at Tallinn State Conservatory.

Works

 1954: operetta "Rummu Jüri"
 1958: operetta "Light in the Home Port" (composed in cooperation with Leo Normet)

References

1911 births
1978 deaths
20th-century Estonian composers
Estonian Academy of Music and Theatre alumni
Academic staff of the Estonian Academy of Music and Theatre
People from Tallinn
Burials at Metsakalmistu
Soviet composers